Earl "Hawk" Davis was an American baseball second baseman in the Negro leagues. He played from 1928 to 1936, spending short stints with the Colored All-Stars, Newark Browns, Newark Dodgers, and Bacharach Giants.

References

External links
 and Baseball-Reference Black Baseball stats and Seamheads

Newark Browns players
Newark Dodgers players
Bacharach Giants players
Year of birth missing
Year of death missing
Baseball infielders